Ion Geolgău (born 20 February 1961) is a former Romanian football midfielder and manager.

Club career
Ion Geolgău was born in Pielești, Dolj County. On 7 November 1976, being 15 years and 9 months old, Geolgău made his Divizia A debut under coach Constantin Teașcă, playing for Universitatea Craiova in a 3–1 victory against UTA Arad. After his debut, writer Adrian Păunescu wrote an article about him called Visul lui Geolgău (Geolgău's dream), in which he mistaken Geolgău's first name calling him Gheorghiță instead of Ion, thus Gheorghiță becoming Ion Geolgău's nickname. On 16 March 1977, he scored his first Divizia A goal at the age of 16 in a 5–0 victory against Progresul București. Geolgău went on to play 13 and a half seasons with Universitatea Craiova, being part of the "Craiova Maxima" generation, helping them win two consecutive league titles in 1980 and 1981, at the first he contributed with 24 appearances and 2 goals and at the second with 29 appearances and 3 goals. He also won the Cupa României four times, in the years 1977, 1978, 1981 and 1983. Geolgău played 38 games and scored 8 goals for "U" Craiova in European competitions, being part of the team that reached the 1982–83 UEFA Cup semi-finals in which he contributed with 2 goals scored in 9 matches in the campaign. In the middle of the 1989–90 season, Geolgău transferred to Argeș Pitești where he would stay only half of season, scoring one goal in 11 Divizia A appearances. After the 1989 Romanian Revolution, Geolgău went to play in the Cypriot First Division for Aris Limassol. After one season spent in Cyprus, he went to play for one year at Belgian side Avenir Lembeek, returning to Romania where he retired at Jiul Craiova. During his whole career, Ion Geolgău played 304 Divizia A matches in which he scored 34 goals and 21 games with one goal scored in the Cypriot First Division.

International career

Ion Geolgău played for Romania in 23 matches, scoring three goals, making his debut on 10 September 1980 when coach Valentin Stănescu sent him on the field in the 60th minute to replace Tudorel Stoica in a friendly which ended with a 2–1 away victory against Bulgaria, which took place in Varna on the Yuri Gagarin Stadium. He played four games at the Euro 1984 qualifiers, scoring the decisive goal that mathematically qualified Romania at the final tournament in a 1–1 against Czechoslovakia, which took place on Tehelné pole from Bratislava, earning him the nickname "The hero from Bratislava". Geolgău also played three matches at the 1986 World Cup qualifiers, scoring one goal in a 3–2 loss against Northern Ireland. His last match for the national team was on 1 June 1988 in a 2–0 away loss in a friendly against Netherlands. Geolgău also played one game for Romania's Olympic team in a 0–0 against Italy at the 1984 Summer Olympics qualifiers.

International goals
Scores and results list Romania's goal tally first.

Managerial career
Ion Geolgău started his coaching career in 1994 at Jiul Petroșani and from 1996 until 1997 he was an assistant coach at Universitatea Craiova. In 1997 he went to coach in the Faroe Islands at HB Tórshavn where he spent five years, winning the title and the cup in 1998. In 2002 he moved to B36 Tórshavn where he stayed until 2003 when he won a cup. In 2004 Geolgău had his last coaching experience at Fram Reykjavík from Iceland.

Personal life
Geolgău said that he was born on 19 February 1961 but his birth date was declared by his father to the People's Council only on 20 February 1961.

Honours

Player
Universitatea Craiova
Divizia A: 1979–80, 1980–81
Cupa României: 1976–77, 1977–78, 1980–81, 1982–83

Manager
HB Tórshavn
Faroe Islands League: 1998
Faroe Islands Cup: 1998
B36 Tórshavn
Faroe Islands Cup: 2003

Notes

References

External links

1961 births
Living people
People from Dolj County
Romanian footballers
Romania international footballers
Olympic footballers of Romania
Romania under-21 international footballers
Romanian expatriate footballers
Liga I players
Liga II players
Cypriot First Division players
CS Universitatea Craiova players
FC Argeș Pitești players
Aris Limassol FC players
Romanian football managers
Romanian expatriate football managers
Expatriate football managers in the Faroe Islands
Expatriate football managers in Iceland
CSM Jiul Petroșani managers
Havnar Bóltfelag managers
B36 Tórshavn managers
Knattspyrnufélagið Fram managers
Romanian expatriate sportspeople in Cyprus
Expatriate footballers in Cyprus
Romanian expatriate sportspeople in Belgium
Expatriate footballers in Belgium
Association football forwards
Romanian expatriate sportspeople in Iceland
Romanian expatriate sportspeople in the Faroe Islands